HP Products, a Ferguson enterprise, headquartered in Indianapolis, Indiana, is a distributor of health and hygiene, packaging, safety, laundry and dietary, lighting, equipment, food service, coffee and beverage, and textile products.

History

Beginnings
In 1964, Donald Ames Shuel bought a struggling business in downtown Indianapolis, H.P. Chemical, and changed the name to HP Chemical Products. The business started with one office and a focus on janitorial products, and goal to provide the best products, services and support.

Growth
As the company began to grow, it became HP Products, and started to diversify its product lines and acquire organizations to meet the changing needs of its customers. In 2000, Shuel's daughter, Bridget Shuel-Walker, assumed the role of President. In 2009, HP Products was valued at $150 million.

Acquisition
With the help of Deloitte Corporate Finance LLC, HP Products began to explore various strategic alternatives to aid in the continued growth of the company. On December 9, 2014 the company announced it was acquired by Ferguson Enterprises, the largest wholesale plumbing distributor in the U.S., to become a wholly owned subsidiary known as HP Products, a Ferguson enterprise. Ferguson Enterprises has been a part of Wolseley plc since 1982. Wolseley plc is listed on the FTSE 100 Index, a list of 100 company's part of the London Stock Exchange.

HP Products today
HP Products is located in six states in the Midwest with over 450 employees. The company has grown to include 5 distribution centers, 3 cross-docks and 500,000-square-feet of warehouse space. In 2013, the company reported $180 million in revenue. HP Products remains one of the largest distributors of its kind in the United States. With its expanded product offering and increased distribution footprint, HP Products is now a single-source supplier for hundreds of customers.

See also
Ferguson Enterprises
Wolseley plc

References

External links
HP Products Official Website
HP Products Blog Site, HP Connect
Ferguson Official Website
Wolseley plc Official Website

Companies based in Indianapolis